Ajron, real Michał Dąbal (born 9 November 1985 in Warsaw) is a Polish music producer, director, editor and cinematographer.

Life and work 
Michał Dąbal started his artistic activity at the beginning of the first decade of the 21st century. Initially, he worked as a hip-hop producer for the music label JuNouMi Records. However, he was famous for his cooperation with the rapper Michał "Małolat" Kapliński, with whom he recorded the album entitled "W pogoni za lepszej jakości życiem", released in 2005. The material reached the 14th place on the list of the most popular albums in Poland (Official Sales Chart). In addition, the duo's hit entitled "W tej grze", which reached the 4th place in the Szczecin Polish Radio Hit List.

Until 2007, Ajron also collaborated with such hip-hop artists as: Noon, Pezet, Eldo and Włodi. Then Dąbal abandoned his musical activity and emigrated to the United States, where he graduated from the American Film Institute Conservatory in Los Angeles. The first success was a year later thanks to the short production of "Pralnia", Dąbal, among others directed, edited and shot for the picture. The film was appreciated by critics, which resulted, among others, in Special Jury Prize at the Independent Cinema Festival "OFF jak gorąco" in Łódź.

Personal life 
He is the son of the cinematographer Wit Dąbal.

References 

1985 births
Polish record producers
Polish cinematographers
People from Warsaw
Living people